Aysel  is a feminine Turkish given name popular in Turkey and Azerbaijan . In Turkish, "Aysel" means "bright moon".

People
 Aysel Baykal (1939–2003), Turkish jurist, politician and former government minister
 Aysel Çelikel (born 1933), Turkish academic, legal scholar, author and former Minister of Justice
 Aysel Gürel (1929–2008), Turkish lyricist
 Aysel Mammadova (born 1989), Azerbaijani singer known as AISEL
 Aysel Manafova (born 1990), Miss Azerbaijan in 2013
 Aysel Özakın, Turkish-British novelist and playwright
 Aysel Özgan (born 1978), Turkish Paralympic shooter
 Aysel Taş (born 1964), Bulgarian born Turkish javelin thrower
 Aysel Teymurzadeh (born 1989), Azerbaijani pop and R&B singer 
 Aysel Tuğluk (born 1965), Turkish politician of Kurdish descent

Notes

Turkish feminine given names